Money Money, More Money is an Indian Telugu film directed by J. D. Chakravarthy. The film is a remake of 2006 Bollywood film Darwaaza Bandh Rakho. The film is touted as a sequel to the films, Money (1993) and Money Money (1995). The film highlights actor Brahmanandam's noted role as Khan Dada in the earlier series.

Plot
Four small-time crooks, Chakri (J. D. Chakravarthy), Raghu (Brahmaji), Abbas (Mukul Dev) and Gogineni Gangaraju aka Goga (Kavin Dave) turn towards kidnapping for some quick money. They kidnap Megahana (Tara Alisha), daughter of a millionaire Jagadish (Nagababu) and they demand money (1 crore). They are forced to barge into the home of a vegetarian family of 35. The head of the household is Khan Dada (Bramhanandam), an ex-don and rival of Chakri.

Their stay in the house gets extended when they learn than Jagadish has gone abroad and they have to wait until he returns. The kidnappers are forced to take more hostages to keep their identity secret and prevent the kidnapping venture from failing. Eventually other people are stuck in the house, such as: Shankarabharanam (Venu Madhav), a pizza guy, Bullabbai (Rajeev Kanakala), a police constable, Trisha (Gajala), a sales girl, Tirumala Shetty (guy who wants money from Khan Dada), etc.

Jagadish finally appears he gives the four kidnappers the money, however there is now a fight between the four, and then Jagadish calls the police. The kidnappers go to Police station, Jagadish and Meghana say Chakri, Goga and Raghu are innocent but not Abbas. After 16 months Chakri owns a hotel and works with Shankarabharanam. Meghana and Chakri are both friends, Trisha works with Raghu on the sales business, Goga owns a sweet shop, Bullabbai is not a constable but a S.I., Abbas goes to jail, and the Khan residence live happily ever after and Khan and Chakri become good friends.

Cast

 J. D. Chakravarthy as Chakri
 Bramhaji as Raghu
 Kevin Dave as Gogineni Gangaraju aka Goga
 Mukul Dev as Abbas
 Bramhanandam as Khan Dada
 Tara Alisha Berry as Meghana
 Gajala as Trisha
 Naga Babu as Jagadish
 Chandramohan as Jagan Pataudi
 Subbaraju as Azharuddin
 Senthil as Dr. Sabhapathi
 Asha Saini as Champa
 Rekha as Geetha Madhuri
 Ramaprabha as Grand Mother
 Geetika as Sweety
 Allari Subhashini as Servant
 Jeeva as Tirumala Shetty
 Venu Madhav as Shankarabharanam
 Rajeev Kanakala as Bullabbai
 Ramjagan as Dattatreya
 Duvvasi Mohan as Munuswamy
 Taarzan as Pizza Shop Owner
 Surya as Babloo Khan
 Narasimha as Sunil Shetty
 Gundu Sudarshan as Sampangi
 Shashank as Police Officer
 Jackie as P.T.Paul
 Jhansi as Jayaprada
 Chalapathi Rao

References

External links
 

2010s Telugu-language films
2011 comedy films
2011 films
Telugu remakes of Hindi films
Indian comedy films
Indian sequel films
Reliance Entertainment films